The Société des transports de Tunis or Transtu is the parastatal authority to manage public mass transit in the greater Tunis area (Grand Tunis). It supervises the bus network, the Métro léger de Tunis (a light railway system) and the TGM light rail link to La Marsa. Transtu was founded in 2003 when the  Société nationale des transports (SNT) and the Société du métro léger de Tunis (SMLT) were combined. Annually Transtu handles about 460 million passagers. The longest line is still line 47

History 
In 1872 Tunisia's first railway was inaugurated linking Tunis to La Goulette. The first trolley, initially horse-drawn, was opened in 1885; electrification of the trams started in 1902. A suburban train between Tunis, Bab Saadoun and La Manouba was opened in 1903. In 1930 bus service was started. By 1944, the trolleys were replaced by trolleybusses. After gaining independence, the transport systems in Tunis were nationalized. The Société nationale des transports (SNT) was charged to manage transit in the greater Tunis area in 1964. The Metro leger was subsequently created to provide a modern transit system without incurring the cost of building a  subterrean metro. First trains on Line 1 began to operate between Tunis and Ben Arous in 1985. In 2003 the SNT and the Société du métro léger de Tunis were combined.

Network 

The authority manages three networks:

 The bus system covers 5,836 kilometers in Tunis and surroundings serving a population of about 2 million people. 1,050 buses are covering 206 lines. The yellow buses indicate their terminals in Arabic and French.
 The Métro léger de Tunis consists of 5 lines that total 82 km; it will be further expanded.
 TGM  connects Tunis and La Marsa.

See also 

 Transport in Tunisia

References
The initial article is based on the corresponding article in the French Wikipedia, accessed 2/13/2003

External links 
 Official site

Rail transport in Tunisia
Tram transport in Tunisia
Public transport operators
Public transport in Tunisia
Transport companies established in 2003
Tunis
Government-owned companies of Tunisia